Hey Ram is a 2000 Indian period  crime drama film written, directed and produced by Kamal Haasan, It was simultaneously made in Tamil and Hindi languages.  The film's soundtrack and score were composed by Ilaiyaraaja. It is an alternate history film that depicts India's Partition and the assassination of Mahatma Gandhi by Nathuram Godse. The Hindi version was distributed by Khan's Dreamz Unlimited.

The film was screened at the International Film Festival of India and selected by Film Federation of India as its submission to the Oscars in the year 2000, but was not nominated. The film has garnered three National Film Awards. Internationally, the film was screened at the 25th Toronto International Film Festival and at the 2000 Locarno Festival.

Plot 

The movie begins in 1999, with Saket Ram, an 89-year-old Hindu man, on his death bed in Madras. He is being taken care of by his grandson (also named Saket Ram) who is a famous novelist who writes historical fiction, and their family doctor, Munawar. The younger Ram explains how he grew up listening to his grandfather's stories and proceeds to narrate one of his grandfather's strange stories that he plans to use for his next novel. As his grandson narrates the story, the dying Saket Ram relives it.

The scene cuts to 1946, when Ram and his Pathan Muslim friend, Amjad Ali Khan are archaeologists working together under Mortimer Wheeler, in Mohenjo-daro in the Sindh province, in what was then North-West India. Relations are good between the Indians and the English. Ram and Amjad do not approve of the planned partition and the upcoming creation of Pakistan. Although many Indian Muslims plan to move to Pakistan, Amjad decides to stay in India as he believes it is his homeland.

After the archaeological site is shut down out of fear of riots, young Ram returns to Calcutta to be with his wife, Aparna. On his way home, he witnesses the riots and chaos during Direct Action Day. While out to get some food, Ram manages to save an innocent Sikh girl from a Muslim mob. When he returns to his house, he is attacked and held hostage by his family tailor, Altaf and a group of Muslims. They rape Aparna, but upon discovering that the police are entering the building, slit Aparna's throat and flee. Unable to cope with his tragic loss, Ram takes his gun and attempts to follow them. He manages to find Altaf, who begs for mercy, although Ram kills him.

Ram continues to shoot at Muslims committing violence in the streets until he runs into Shriram Abhyankar, a Thanjavur Marathi who is leading a group of a Hindus. Realizing that they are both Hindu and thus not enemies, Abhyankar offers Ram a chance to join his militia. Abhyankar informs Ram that the individual responsible is none other than Mohandas Karamchand Gandhi and gives him a banned book on anti-Gandhi rhetoric to read.

In 1947, now having returned to his hometown of Thanjavur, Ram's brother Bashyahm and sister Vasantha urge him to remarry. He is then married to the daughter of family friends, Mythili. While his wedding is being celebrated across the village, Ram tells his childhood friends Vedha and Yegham that he has no reason to be happy since the world's biggest political divorce is going on with the partition of India. During his first night, he learns that Mythili, like her family, are supporters of Gandhi and that the Mahatma will be visiting Calcutta a few days later on the anniversary of the bloody riots. Ram travels to Calcutta alone, where he visits his old home and laments at his loss. Then he joins a mob that confronts Gandhi and Huseyn Shaheed Suhrawardy, the Chief Minister of Bengal, about the bloody riots. When questioned about whether they take full responsibility for the riots, both of them accept it and ask for forgiveness. The mob forgives them, but Ram refuses to.

Although Ram remains aloof at first, he slowly falls in love with Mythili. However, on their honeymoon in Maharashtra, Ram and Mythili bump into a disguised Abhyankar, who introduces them to a dethroned Maharaja. During a hunting trip with Abhyankar and the Maharaja, Ram is reunited with his old Sindhi friend from Calcutta, Manohar Lalwani, who lost his family and home in the riots. After seeing Lalwani's misery, Ram realises he has still not gotten over Aparna's murder and his hatred is reignited. Abhyankar and the Maharaj's group hold the belief that Gandhi is solely responsible for the division of India and the violence between two religions, and believe him to be a traitor for supporting and protecting Muslims rather than his own Hindu people. As extremist Hindu fundamentalists, they plot to murder Gandhi and task Ram with performing the deed. Due to a horse-riding accident, Abhyankar is left quadriplegic and has Ram swear that he will renounce personal relationships and carry on his work of killing Gandhi.

Back in the present, Ram's situation worsens. His grandson and Dr. Munawar take him to the hospital, but are stopped by the police since there are bomb blasts in Madras due to Hindu-Muslim communal riots, as the day is anniversary of demolition of the Babri masjid, prompting the elderly Ram remarks how the Hindu-Muslim violence is still rampant in present day. A police officer makes them hide in an underground shelter for their safety. As they try to stay silent to avoid being attacked by the mob, Ram reminisces about how he plotted to kill Gandhi many decades ago.

Back in newly independent India, Ram begins to prepare to assassinate Gandhi once he returns to Madras. A pregnant Mythili becomes worried as her husband grows more distant and invites her parents and in-laws over to cheer him up. However, Ram has made up his mind to kill Gandhi and leaves Mythili, traveling to Varanasi where he goes through a purification and renouncement ritual. Then, he heads for Delhi and unknowingly stays at the same hotel as another fundamentalist planning to kill Gandhi, Nathuram Godse. When the police arrive to question Godse, a paranoid Ram hides his gun on a delivery truck, which departs from the hotel. Later on, Ram goes to the soda factory in Chandni Chowk in order to retrieve his gun.

In Chandni Chowk, Ram is reunited with Amjad, who takes him to the soda factory. It is revealed that many Muslims civilians, including Amjad's wife Nafisa and their children, are hiding there out of fear of being attacked by Hindus during curfew. When it is discovered that Ram came there for a gun, the Muslims, suspicious that he might be out to kill them, attack him. A fight ensues that triggers a series of violent events in the area. While trying to escape both Hindu and Muslim mobs, Amjad finds out that Ram is in Delhi to assassinate Gandhi and he tries to convince his friend to not do it. He reveals that his father did not die of natural causes, but was murdered by a Hindu mob and asks Ram to ebb his hatred.

Just then, they are cornered by a Hindu mob who try to kill Amjad. Despite Ram's attempts to protect him, Amjad is struck on the back of the head with a hammer and Ram takes him back to the soda factory. Together, they then help protect the Muslims hiding in the soda factory until the authorities arrive to control the situation, although Amjad is shot.

While in the hospital, Amjad is questioned by a police officer about the Hindu man whom eyewitnesses state started the violence. Amjad lies that he has never seen that man before, and all he knows is his brother Ram who despite everything, saved his life. He then dies holding Ram's hand.

Subsequently, Ram runs into his father-in-law and his friend who are there to meet Gandhi. He learns that his uncle and elder sister have died after learning he has left. Gandhi requests to see Ram to invite him on his long walk to Pakistan after finding out he helped save innocent Muslims. Ram ultimately changes his mind about Gandhi after seeing that his teachings are all about love and non-violence. He decides against assassinating the leader, and attempts to confess the truth to him in order to beg for forgiveness. Gandhi interrupts him, informing Ram that they can talk about it during their long walk to Pakistan. However, seconds later, Gandhi is assassinated by Godse. Then on, Ram lives by Gandhian principles.

As the situation on the streets starts to cool down, Ram whispers his last words to his grandson and eventually dies. During Ram's funeral, Gandhi's great-grandson Tushar Gandhi comes over and visits Ram's private room, which is full of historical photos. Ram's grandson hands over Gandhi's footwear and spectacles which his late grandfather had previously collected from the place of the shootout and had treasured throughout his life.

Cast 

Opening credits
Kamal Haasan as Saket Ram / Bhairav
Shah Rukh Khan as Amjad Ali Khan
Hema Malini as Ambujam, Mythili's Mother
Rani Mukerji as Aparna
Girish Karnad as Uppilli Iyengar, Mythili's Father
Naseeruddin Shah as Mahatma Gandhi
Om Puri as Goel
Vikram Gokhale as Maharaja
Saurabh Shukla as Lalvani Sindi
Nassar as Ibrahim, Police Officer
Abbas as Dr. Munavar
Atul Kulkarni as Shriram Abhayankar / Ramakrishna Pande
Sowcar Janaki as Mythili's grandmother
Vaali as Bhashyam Iyengar
Iravati Harshe as Nafisa
Vasundhara Das as Mythili

Closing credits
V. S. Raghavan as K. T. Chari
Delhi Ganesh as Chari
Gollapudi Maruti Rao as Govardhan
Y. G. Mahendran as Yagyam
Vaiyapuri as Vedha (Tamil) / Arun Mehra as Vedha (Hindi)
Arun Bali as Shaheed Suhrawardy
Shadaab Khan as Altaf Tailor
Yatin Karyekar as Qureshi
Manoj Pahwa as Jalal
Chandrahasan as Mohangandhi Raman

Mohini Mathur as Haajra Begum
Tushar Gandhi as himself
Sharad Ponkshe as Nathuram Godse
Shubhangi Gokhale as Rani
Annapurna as Mrs. Chattopadhyay
Shruti K. Haasan as Vallabhbhai Patel's daughter
Aravind as Sankar Kishthaya
Shabbir as Aparna's attacker
A. C. Murali as Parthasarathy
Nikita Palekar as Pushpa Iyengar
Deleted Scenes
Nawazuddin Siddiqui
Saranya Ponvannan

Production

Development 
Kamal Haasan had wasted all of 1998 on filming Marudhanayagam, which ended up in production hell, and did not act in any other film during the period (barring Kaathala Kaathala), much to the dismay of his fans. To please them, he sought to begin and finish another film before resuming work on Marudhanayagam, which became Hey Ram. Another motivation for Haasan to do the film was because, although he was born in a family of people devoted towards Mahatma Gandhi, he himself was not initially a devotee, and had a critical view of Gandhi even as a teenager. Haasan initially intended to title the film as Satya Sodanai, a reference to the title of Gandhi's autobiography, published in English as The Story of My Experiments with Truth, but later decided on Hey Ram, the last words allegedly spoken by Gandhi when he was assassinated by Nathuram Godse. The film was produced by Haasan and his brother Chandrahasan under their banner Raaj Kamal Films International, and was the company's first film to be shot simultaneously in Tamil and Hindi. The dialogues for the Hindi version were written by Manohar Shyam Joshi. Cinematography was handled by Tirru, and editing by Renu Saluja.

Casting 
Haasan chose the Bollywood actor Shah Rukh Khan to portray the Pathan character Amjad Ali Khan, partly because the actor's father was a Pathan who was from Peshawar. Though not a native Tamil speaker, Khan dubbed in his own voice. He did not ask for any remuneration from Haasan, as he considered it an honour and privilege to work with one of his mentors. The Marathi actor Mohan Gokhale was initially cast as Shriram Abhyankar; he had started working on the film in Madras but died suddenly due to a heart attack. Haasan later chose Atul Kulkarni, another Marathi actor, to do the role. Hema Malini, who had reduced acting in films by then, accepted to act as Ambujam after being offered the role by Haasan. For the role of Ambujam's daughter Mythili, Haasan initially wanted Malini's daughter Esha Deol; however, it ultimately went to Vasundhara Das. Hassan's daughter Shruti made her acting debut portraying the role of Vallabhai Patel's daughter.

Haasan initially considered having British actor Ben Kingsley, who portrayed Gandhi in a 1982 film, to reprise the role in Hey Ram but dropped the idea as he felt "it would be cliched and the film wouldn't be honest". He later approached Naseeruddin Shah, who portrayed Gandhi in a play. Shah was initially reluctant due to the long hours of makeup required, but eventually accepted. Haasan wanted a Bengali woman to portray Saket Ram's Bengali wife Aparna, and chose Rani Mukerji, also because of her Bollywood stardom. Saurabh Shukla was cast as a Sindhi character Lalwani after Haasan was impressed with his performance in Satya (1998). Girish Karnad, who portrayed Saket Ram's father-in-law Uppili Iyengar, recommended Sharad Ponkshe, who portrayed Godse in the Marathi play Me Nathuram Godse Boltoy, to Haasan for reprising his role in the film. Gandhi's great grandson Tushar wanted to join the film, and Haasan accepted; Tushar plays himself. Mohini Mathur, who was 13 years old when witnessing Gandhi's assassination, accepted Haasan's request to play Amjad Ali Khan's mother Haajra.

Filming 
Principal photography began on 22 March 1999. The then Shankaracharya of Kanchi had filmed an interview scene for the film but later requested that his portions be removed to avoid controversy. To achieve on-site dubbing of dialogues, Haasan hired Srivastav from Mumbai. Production of the film cost a total of ₹11 crore (worth ₹92 crore in 2021 prices), excluding Haasan's salary. In order to show Mohenjodaro of ancient times, the crew recreated a set at a village near Chennai as the original location was located at Pakistan which crew felt was impossible to go to due to political reasons.

Soundtrack 
Initially Haasan chose violinist L. Subramaniam to compose music for the film. Haasan completed shooting the whole film along with the song sequences that were composed by Subramaniam. According to Haasan, when he approached Subramaniam for the final sound for mixing, he had asked for ₹1 crore, which was not the amount agreed upon earlier. So, Haasan went to composer Ilaiyaraaja to help him solve this situation. Haasan told Ilaiyaraaja that the songs had already been shot with the music composed by Subramaniam and he wanted to remove the songs and re-shoot them with Ilaiyaraaja's. On hearing that, Ilaiyaraaja suggested to Haasan that he could fix it without Haasan needing to re-shoot any footage or songs. Puzzled, Haasan was initially reluctant. Then Ilaiyaraaja asked Haasan if he did not have trust in him, and Haasan immediately agreed. Subramaniam said he left the project, fearing that his association with the film may offend Hindu people due to its contentious storyline.

The lyrics for the songs were not changed, but Ilaiyaraaja composed new tunes for the songs that would be in sync with the already shot footage. The background music and the songs were recorded in Hungary's Budapest Symphony Orchestra and thus Hey Ram became the first Tamil film and the second Indian film to be re-recorded with a foreign symphony orchestra. The first one was Ilaiyaraaja's own score for the Malayalam film Guru (1997). The song "Isaiyil Thodangudhamma" was not present initially, but Ilaiyaraaja had seen an opportunity for a possible song in the scene and asked Haasan to give him a chance to add one. But Haasan, being the writer-director of the film, didn't see it. Then Ilaiyaraaja convinced Haasan to trust him with this and brought notable Hindustani singer Ajoy Chakrabarty to sing one of the most celebrated songs from the movie, "Isaiyil Thodanguthamma" and also writing the lyrics for the same.

Release 
Hey Ram was released simultaneously in Tamil and Hindi on 18 February 2000. A digitally remastered version of the film was released on 8 November 2019 on Amazon Prime Video. Internationally, the film was screened at the 25th Toronto International Film Festival and at the 2000 Locarno Festival. In 2015, Hey Ram was screened at the Habitat Film Festival. The film was re-released at Sathyam Cinemas on 8 November 2019.

Controversies 
There were protests and press releases by political parties in select centres against the perceived negative depiction of Gandhi.

Critical reception 
Hey Ram received critical acclaim. T. Krithika Reddy from The Hindu wrote, "Live sound, prosthetic make-up (Micheal Westmore), splendid cinematography (Thiru), magnificent art work (Sabu Cyril) and painstakingly designed costumes (Sarika) are some of the other highlights of this magnum opus, which is distinct in style and content...The chemistry between Kamal and Rani is explosive to say the least. Shah Rukh Khan, as usual comes up with an impeccable performance. Vasundhara, as the stoic second wife makes an impressive debut. Naseerudin Shah as Gandhi steals a clear march over the others in supporting roles." Dinakaran wrote, "The starting of 2000 itself has given a great joy to Tamil cinema! A Tamilian has created a film that caters to international standards." Methil Renuka of India Today praised the film's "technical wizardry" and cast performances but called it "difficult to categorize". K. N. Vijiyan of New Straits Times said, "To this writer, the message of the need for unity among various religious faiths was well told by Kamalhaasan". Indolink.com gave the film 3 stars, writing: "Despite flaws, a bold and brave film by Kamal Hassan"

Box office 
The Hindi version of Hey Ram grossed ₹8.91 crore in India and $550,000 overseas.

India 
The Hindi version opened on 18 February 2000 across 115 screens and netted ₹2.39 crore in opening week and ₹5.32 crore lifetime. It was the 35th-highest-grossing film of 2000 in India.

Overseas 
At the overseas box office, the Hindi version grossed $350,000 in opening week and $550,000 lifetime.

Accolades

See also 
List of artistic depictions of Mahatma Gandhi
List of historical films set in Asia

References

Bibliography

External links 

Philip's Fil-ums review

2000 films
Films about Mahatma Gandhi
2000s crime drama films
2000s Hindi-language films
2000 multilingual films
2000s Tamil-language films
Cultural depictions of Jawaharlal Nehru
Cultural depictions of Louis Mountbatten, 1st Earl Mountbatten of Burma
Cultural depictions of Mahatma Gandhi
Cultural depictions of Muhammad Ali Jinnah
Cultural depictions of Vallabhbhai Patel
Films about World War II alternate histories
Films directed by Kamal Haasan
Films featuring a Best Supporting Actor National Film Award-winning performance
Films scored by Ilaiyaraaja
Films scored by L. Subramaniam
Films set in 1947
Films set in the Indian independence movement
Films set in Tiruchirappalli
Films that won the Best Costume Design National Film Award
Films that won the Best Special Effects National Film Award
Indian crime drama films
Indian multilingual films
Works about the Mahatma Gandhi assassination